Megalota vera is a moth of the family Tortricidae. It is found in Thailand, New Guinea, the Bismarck Islands, Bali, the Moluccas and Australia (northern Queensland).

References

Moths described in 1966
Olethreutini